Vitaliano Trevisan (12 December 1960 – 7 January 2022) was an Italian writer, playwright, and actor.

Life and career 
In the following years he also had a busy career as a playwright, and among his major stage works there were Il lavoro rende liberi ("Work sets you free") staged by Toni Servillo and Giulietta, an adaptation of a short story of Federico Fellini. He was also active in television and cinema, notably collaborating with Matteo Garrone as a screenwriter and an actor in First Love.

Death 
Trevisan died in Crespadoro on 7 January 2022, at the age of 61. His death, apparently caused by a medicine overdose, was ruled as a suicide. He left a suicide note, in which he wrote among other things "I am exhausted and I can't take it anymore", and "nobody must feel responsible as nobody could have done anything".

Publications
 Un mondo meraviglioso (1997)
 Trio senza pianoforte (1998)
 I quindicimila passi. Un resoconto (2002)
 Standards vol.1° (2002)
 Un mondo meraviglioso. Uno standard (2003)
 Shorts (2004) 
 Wordstar(s). Trilogia alla memoria (2004)
 Il lavoro rende liberi (2005)
 Oscillazioni (2006)
 Note sui sillabari (2007)
 3 drammi brevi (2008)
 Il ponte. Un crollo (2008)
 Madre con cuscino (2009)
 Grotteschi e arabeschi (2009)
 Due monologhi (2009)
 Tristissimi giardini (2010)
 Una notte in Tunisia (2011)
 Works (2016)

Selected filmography
First Love (2004) 
 Questioni di pelle (2006)
 Riparo (2006) 
 R.I.S. Roma - Delitti imperfetti (TV-Series, 2009)
 Once Upon a Time the City of Fools (2010)
 Things from Another World (2011) 
 Finché c'è prosecco c'è speranza  (2017)
 Il grande passo (2019)

References

External links 
 

1960 births
2022 deaths
2022 suicides
People from the Province of Vicenza
Italian dramatists and playwrights
Italian film actors
Italian screenwriters
Italian television actors
Italian stage actors
 

Drug-related suicides in Italy